Synochoneura is a genus of moths belonging to the subfamily Tortricinae of the family Tortricidae.

Species
Synochoneura dentana Wang & Li, 2007
Synochoneura fansipangana Razowski, 2008
Synochoneura ochriclivis (Meyrick, in Caradja, 1931)
Synochoneura sapana Razowski, 2008
Synochoneura tapaishani (Caradja, 1939)

See also
List of Tortricidae genera

References

 , 2005: World catalogue of insects volume 5 Tortricidae.
 , 1955, Tijdschr. Ent. 98: 151.

External links
tortricidae.com

Cnephasiini
Tortricidae genera